Seyd Abbas (also Romanized as Seyd ʿAbbās) is a village in Beyranvand-e Shomali Rural District, Bayravand District, Khorramabad County, Lorestan Province, Iran. At the 2006 census, its population was 50, in 10 families.

References 

Towns and villages in Khorramabad County